Albert Hammond Jr. (born Hammond III; born April 9, 1980) is an American musician, singer, songwriter and record producer. He is best known for his role as rhythm and lead guitarist, as well as occasional keyboard player and backing vocalist, in the American rock band The Strokes. Hammond Jr. released his debut solo album Yours to Keep in 2006 and followed up with ¿Cómo Te Llama? in 2008. Since then, he has released the 2013 EP AHJ, and the albums Momentary Masters and Francis Trouble in 2015 and 2018, respectively.

Early life
Hammond was born in Los Angeles, California. He is the son of British-Gibraltarian singer-songwriter Albert Hammond, a prolific songwriter best known for his 1972 hit single "It Never Rains in Southern California", and Argentine Claudia Fernández, a former model and beauty pageant winner. He has two older half-sisters. A first generation American, Hammond is of mixed Gibraltarian, Argentine, Austrian, and Peruvian descent; his first language was Spanish. Hammond began playing the guitar at age nine. He was a championship-winning roller skater as a child.

At the age of 12, Hammond Jr. was sent to boarding school Institut Le Rosey in Switzerland. While there, he became friends with future Strokes bandmate Julian Casablancas, a grade above him, whom he connected with as a fellow American Hammond moved back to Los Angeles where he completed his high school education at the Buckley School. Following graduation in 1998, Hammond moved from Los Angeles to New York City and, having deferred admittance to New York University, took a short-term filmmaking course at the New York Film Academy. He later attended NYU's Tisch School of the Arts, but left after a year and a half.

Career

The Strokes 

After moving to New York City in September 1998, Hammond reconnected with his former school friend Casablancas, who later invited him to join the Strokes. Made up of Casablancas' other schoolmates Nikolai Fraiture, Nick Valensi, and Fabrizio Moretti, Hammond Jr. was the last person to join the band in 1999. In the following two years, the band practiced and performed tirelessly, all while Hammond Jr. was also attending NYU and working at Kim's Video. The Strokes released their first demo in January 2001, beginning a record label bidding war and years of critical acclaim. Since 2001, Hammond Jr., as part of the Strokes, has released two EPs and six full-length albums, most recently The New Abnormal in 2020.

Hammond is usually seen playing a 1985 '70s reissue Olympic White Fender Stratocaster or Gibson Les Paul Jr. that is sometimes used by bandmate Nick Valensi. On the majority of the Strokes' songs he plays rhythm guitar, and solos are played by Valensi. The songs in which Hammond does play solos are "Last Nite", "Trying Your Luck", "Take It or Leave It", "Under Control", "The End Has No End", "Ize of the World", "Threat of Joy", "Vision of Division", and "Drag Queen". His solos tend to focus largely on more emotional, "bluesy"-type melodic work, and the guitar tends to have a cleaner, softer tone in comparison to Valensi's (with a notable exception found in "Vision of Division"). He often holds his guitar in a high horizontal position, similar to Buddy Holly, which he says is so that he can dance better.

Although vocalist Julian Casablancas is the primary songwriter in the Strokes, Hammond co-wrote the track "Automatic Stop" with Casablancas for the group's second album Room on Fire. He has been credited with writing three mostly instrumental songs ("Swiss Beats", "Holland", and "By the Way") for the band's 2001 tour video titled In Transit. These songs were reworked for his later solo album and have different titles ("Everyone Gets a Star", "Bright Young Thing", "In Transit"). He wrote "Elephant Song" when he was required to record a song for his Sound 101 class during his freshman year and used the school's recording equipment. The song was played at a few shows before the release of the Strokes' debut album. They later re-recorded the song as a special giveaway for fan club members.

Solo career

Yours to Keep and ¿Cómo Te Llama? (2006–2013) 

In October 2005, Hammond and Ben Kweller released a version of "Wait" on This Bird Has Flown – A 40th Anniversary Tribute to the Beatles' Rubber Soul.

Hammond released a solo album titled Yours to Keep in the U.K. through Rough Trade Records on October 9, 2006 and in North America through New Line Records/Scratchie Records on March 6, 2007. Produced by Thin Lizard Dawn vocalist Lattimer and recorded at the Electric Lady Studios in New York City, the album features several musical guests, such as Sean Lennon, Ben Kweller, The Strokes' manager Ryan Gentles, Jody Porter of Fountains of Wayne, Chris Feinstein, Mikki James, Sammy James Jr. (The Mooney Suzuki) and the Strokes' lead singer, Casablancas. Bassist Josh Lattanzi and drummer Matt Romano serve as the backing band, with Hammond on guitar and vocals. The first single taken from the album, "101,"  was released exclusively through iTunes on September 4, 2006. "101" was the follow-up single to "Everyone Gets a Star". The music video debuted online in March 2007. It was going to be available in general music stores, unlike "Everyone Gets A Star" which was only available through UK iTunes Music Store. It was released on November 27, 2006. The music video for "In Transit" was directed by Joaquin Phoenix.

Hammond has said to have been "waiting to make a record like this for years". Early support from his bandmates in the Strokes was only evident after Casablancas' role playing bass and back-up vocals on the track "Scared", though all of the members (with the exclusion of Nick Valensi, who was busy taking care of his newborn children) attended his shows in and around New York.

On March 16, 2007, at the South by Southwest festival, Hammond performed a 12-song set including covers of Frank Black's "Old Black Dawning" and Guided By Voices' "Postal Blowfish". Hammond also regularly covered the Cars' "Don't Cha Stop" in live performances. He supported Bloc Party on their world tour before making stops at Montreal's Metropolis and Toronto's Kool Haus. After this, Hammond headlined two North American tours along with a European tour. The North American tour featured his friends, the Mooney Suzuki. In November 2006, Hammond was announced to be joining Incubus on tour during their North American tour for their new album Light Grenades.  On August 29, 2007, Hammond announced on MySpace that he was going back into the studio to record his second album in October 2007 for five weeks.

On March 20, 2008, Hammond posted a blog entry on MySpace in which he revealed the title of his second album: ¿Cómo Te Llama? He wrote that it contained 13 songs with a total length of 46 minutes and 30 seconds. He stated he hoped to be touring with the new album until the end of 2008. On May 27, 2008, Hammond released "GfC", the first single off ¿Cómo Te Llama?, on iTunes in the U.S. The song was played extensively live on his 2007 tour. A non-album song titled "& So It Goes" was released as a B-side along with the single. The album was released on July 7, 2008.

On May 29, 2008, Hammond was Myspace's featured artist and exclusively premiered his new album ¿Cómo Te Llama? uploading all the tracks of the album on his official Myspace page. He celebrated the release of his album with a  July 8 small show at the Virgin Megastore, Union Square, in New York City. A noted absence from Hammond's band was recording bassist Josh Latzanni. Steve Schiltz of the band Longwave, who toured with Hammond on his first album also was missing. Although Hammond was supposed to play only two or three songs, he ended up playing almost 10, with a selection that included both new and old tracks. This show kicked off his worldwide tour in support of ¿Cómo Te Llama? with the next show being sold-out at the landmark venue Spaceland in the Silver Lake neighborhood of Los Angeles. This was his only appearance on the West Coast. The following month, Hammond's website officially announced that Hammond would be the support act of the British band Coldplay during their European Tour, which kicked off on September 1 in Strasbourg, France.

AHJ EP and Momentary Masters (2013–2017) 

In an interview with Har Mar Superstar in July 2013, Hammond revealed that he had recorded a five-song EP to be released via Julian Casablancas' Cult Records. Titled AHJ, it was released on October 8, 2013. Hammond stated in an interview promoting the EP on December 5, 2013, that he would be interested in playing solo as an opening act if the Strokes announced another tour: "I would definitely ask the guys if I could open for them. That'd be amazing."

On June 22, 2014, a photo was posted to Hammond's official Facebook page of himself in a room with other musicians and the caption "the start of something new; LP 3," suggesting that he is working on a third full-length album. Hammond released his third LP Momentary Masters on July 31, 2015 in the U.S. via Vagrant Records. The first single, "Born Slippy", was made instantly available for streaming and download via YouTube and iTunes respectively. Both AHJ and Momentary Masters were produced with Hammond Jr.'s close collaborator Gus Oberg.

Hammond Jr. covered "The Little Boy That Santa Claus Forgot" by Vera Lynn mixed with the chorus from George Harrison's "My Sweet Lord" as part of Amazon's annual music series titled Indie for the Holidays. The song was released on December 1, 2017.

Francis Trouble (2018–present) 
Hammond Jr.'s fourth solo album Francis Trouble was released via Red Bull Records on March 9, 2018. The first single "Muted Beatings" was released on February 2, 2018. In 2019 he released a new single, "Fast Times," preceding a brief Western USA tour. That May, he released the single "More to Life". The following year Albert was featured on the 2020 song "Another Hit of Showmanship" by the rock band the Struts.

Artistry

Music 
Guided By Voices, The Beach Boys, Buddy Holly, Frank Black, John Lennon, Matthew Sweet and The Velvet Underground are cited as Hammond's musical influences.

Albert's main guitar is a Fender Stratocaster Arctic White 1985 Reissue of a 1972. He owns three white Stratocasters, a Gibson Les Paul special single cutaway, a Rickenbacker 325, and a Gretsch hollowbody. His amplifier is a Fender Hot Rod DeVille 2x12. His pedal board is made up of an old version of the MXR Micro Amp, a V1 Jekyll and Hyde Ultimate Overdrive and Distortion, and a BOSS TU-2 tuner. In later shows, he adds another Micro Amp, and Jekyll and Hyde, and a Boss Digital Delay. He now uses a Mad Professor Deep Blue Delay pedal instead of the Boss Digital Delay.

Fashion 
Hammond Jr.'s sartorial trademark is wearing formal three-piece suits, and has been said by bandmate Julian Casablancas to be the most influential on the band's style. Hammond Jr. most recently collaborated with designer Amber Doyle for the Strokes' 2019 European tour. In a 2018 interview he stated that he'd had a passion for style from an early age, and has always combined his own designs with retail favorites. While Hammond has been best known for his formal wear, he launched his own range of Francis Trouble t-shirts and sports incorporated classic vintage tees.

In 2009, Hammond released his own line of men's suits which he co-designed with stylist Ilaria Urbinati. The suits were at first only available at Urbinati's soon-to-open Confederacy boutique in Los Angeles. Speaking about the designing endeavor, Hammond Jr. told New York magazine, "I want to make suits that I'm going to have for myself. They're for the person who needs his one suit for a wedding. He'd rather get something like this than go to Men's Wearhouse, pay the same amount, and look like an out-of-date parent." Hammond also collaborated with Elliot Aronow of Jacques-Elliott for a collection of ties in 2015.

Personal life 
Hammond Jr. has been married to Polish restaurateur Justyna Hammond Jr. (née Sroka) since December 23, 2013; she distinctively incorporates the suffix Jr. in her surname. As of 2020, the two live in Los Angeles. The couple have one daughter, Holiday, born on March 7, 2021. 

Hammond Jr. also continues to or has previously maintained homes in the Nolita neighborhood of Manhattan and in New York's Catskill Mountains; in the late 2000s, he built his recording studio, One Way Studios, near his home in Port Jervis and later moved to the nearby community of Eldred. In the 2000s, he had relationships with British supermodel Agyness Deyn, as well as American musician Catherine Pierce of The Pierces.

In the 2000s, Hammond Jr. suffered from a serious drug addiction that involved cocaine, heroin and ketamine, among other drugs. He entered rehab in 2009 and has been sober since.

Discography

Studio albums

EPs

Singles

Notes

See also 
 List of Gibraltarians
 Music of Gibraltar
 Argentine American

References

External links
 
 
 
Spin Magazine feature, October 2003, retrieved March 25, 2007
Star Magazine web feature, March 28, 2007

1980 births
Living people
American indie rock musicians
American male singers
American expatriates in Switzerland
American people of Argentine descent
American people of Gibraltarian descent
American people of English descent
American rock guitarists
American male guitarists
American rock singers
Songwriters from California
Alumni of Institut Le Rosey
The Strokes members
Alternative rock guitarists
Guitarists from Los Angeles
Rhythm guitarists
Singers from Los Angeles
21st-century American singers
Cult Records artists